Mandia is a surname. Notable people with the surname include:

Chris Mandia, American veteran, playwright, screenwriter, and film director
Claudia Mandia (born 1992), Italian archer
Ledina Mandia (born 1974), Albanian politician
Scott Mandia, American academic